Christopher Becker Whitley (August 31, 1960 – November 20, 2005) was an American blues/rock singer-songwriter and guitarist. During his 25-year career he released more than a dozen albums, had two songs in the top 50 of the Billboard mainstream rock charts and received two Independent Music Awards. Whitley's sound was drawn from the traditions of blues, jazz and rock and he recorded songs by artists from many genres. He died in 2005 of lung cancer at the age of 45.

Early life
Whitley was born in Houston, Texas and learned to play guitar when he was fifteen. His father was an art director and his mother was a sculptor. During his youth he lived in Dallas, Texas, Oklahoma, Connecticut, Mexico and Vermont. His parents "grew up on race radio in the South" and their musical tastes—including Muddy Waters, Howlin' Wolf, Bob Dylan and Jimi Hendrix—influenced Whitley.

Career
During the early 1980s Whitley was busking on the streets of New York City and collaborating with musicians Marc Miller, Arto Lindsay and Michael Beinhorn. He was given a plane ticket to Ghent, Belgium in 1981, and lived there for six years, recording several albums and playing with the bands Kuruki, 2 Belgen, Nacht Und Nebel, Alan Fawn, and A Noh Rodeo.

In 1988, producer Daniel Lanois heard Whitley perform at the Mondo Cane club in New York City and he helped Whitley obtain a recording contract with Columbia Records. In 1991 two of Whitley's songs charted on the Billboard Mainstream Rock charts: "Big Sky Country" (number 36) and "Living with the Law" (number 28).

In 2000, Whitley recorded his album Perfect Day, an album of cover songs, with Chris Wood and Billy Martin and followed up with the album Rocket House  in 2001.

Whitley's song "Breaking Your Fall" from the album Hotel Vast Horizon (2003) won the 3rd Annual Independent Music Awards for Folk/Singer-Songwriter Song. In 2004 he won The 4th Annual Independent Music Award for Blues/R&B Song for his composition "Her Furious Angels" from the album War Crime Blues. Whitley was an inaugural member of The Independent Music Awards' judging panel to support independent artists and collaborated with Jeff Lang on an album called Dislocation Blues in 2005.

Style
Whitley's style drew on an array of influences. In 2001, The New York Times described him as "restless, moving into noise-rock and minimalist jazz evoking Chet Baker and Sonic Youth as much as Robert Johnson". He recorded songs by Robert Johnson and Bob Dylan as well as Lou Reed, James Brown, J.J. Cale, The Clash, Nat King Cole, The Doors, Willie Dixon, The Flaming Lips, Jimi Hendrix, Howlin' Wolf, The Jesus and Mary Chain, Kraftwerk, Gary Numan, The Passions, Prince, The Stooges, and Sonny Boy Williamson II.

Notable fans of Whitley's music include, ATO co-founder Dave Matthews, blues guitarist Robert Lockwood, Jr., Bruce Springsteen, John Mellencamp, Bruce Hornsby, Tom Petty, Jacob Golden, Myles Kennedy, Don Henley, Iggy Pop, Alanis Morissette, Sandi Thom, John Mayer, Gavin DeGraw, Joey DeGraw, Johnny A., Joe Bonamassa, Keith Richards and Darling Burns.

Whitley used various alternate tunings and, among other musical instruments, often played slide guitar on a National resonator guitar.

Death
In fall 2005, Whitley canceled his tour due to health issues. In November he was reported to be terminally ill with lung cancer and under the care of hospice. He died on November 20, 2005 in Houston, Texas at the age of 45. After his death, musician John Mayer said, "[Whitley's] somewhat prostrated place in pop culture earned him a sidebar of an obituary, but to those who knew his work, it registers as one of the most underappreciated losses in all of music." Whitley is survived by his brother Dan and his musician daughter, Trixie Whitley.

Discography
Living with the Law (1991)
Big Sky Country (single, 1991)
Din of Ecstasy (1995)
Terra Incognita (1997)
Dirt Floor (1998)
Live at Martyrs' (1999/2000 - recorded live 1999)
Perfect Day featuring Billy Martin and Chris Wood (2000)
Rocket House (2001)
Long Way Around: An Anthology: 1991-2001 (2002)
Pigs Will Fly (soundtrack) with Warner Poland and Kai-Uwe Kohlschmidt (2003)
Hotel Vast Horizon (2003)
Weed (2004)
War Crime Blues (2004)
Big Sky Country (2005 Sony BMG release highlighting his Columbia Records years)
Soft Dangerous Shores (2005)
Reiter In with The Bastard Club (2006)
Dislocation Blues with Jeff Lang (2006)
On Air (2008 - recorded live 2003)

References

External links

Bio at Messenger Records

1960 births
2005 deaths
American blues guitarists
American male guitarists
American blues singers
American street performers
Blues rock musicians
Slide guitarists
American rock guitarists
American rock singers
American rock songwriters
Columbia Records artists
ATO Records artists
Musicians from Houston
Deaths from cancer in Texas
Deaths from lung cancer
Resonator guitarists
Independent Music Awards winners
20th-century American singers
20th-century American guitarists
Singer-songwriters from Texas
Guitarists from Texas
20th-century American male musicians
American male singer-songwriters
Australian banjoists